The Custos Rotulorum of County Wicklow was the highest civil officer in County Wicklow, Ireland. The position was later combined with that of Lord Lieutenant of Wicklow.

Incumbents

1763–1772 Edward Brabazon, 7th Earl of Meath
1772–1790 Anthony Brabazon, 8th Earl of Meath 
1793–1797 William Brabazon, 9th Earl of Meath 
1797–1851 John Brabazon, 10th Earl of Meath

For later custodes rotulorum, see Lord Lieutenant of Wicklow

References

Lists of custodes rotulorum
County Wicklow-related lists